Deshe Bideshe is the first book and one of the most famous works of Bengali author, journalist, travel enthusiast, academician, scholar and linguist Syed Mujtaba Ali. The book describes his experience on his stay in Kabul from 1927 to 1929 and was originally published serially during 1948 in the Indian weekly magazine Desh, New Age Publishers Pvt. Ltd. of Kolkata published it in book form the same year. 

An English translation by Nazes Afroz, the former BBC executive editor of South and Central Asia, was published by Speaking Tiger Books as In a Land Far from Home in 2015. The book was shortlisted for the Raymond Crossword Book Award 2016.

Plot
Syed Mujtaba Ali stayed in Kabul for one and a half year to work as a teacher and described his experience in Afghanistan in the book.  The book shows his keen observations but written with a sense of humor.

Characters
 Amanullah Khan
 Bacha-e-Saqao (Habibullah Kalakani)
 Muhammed
 Bolshov
 Ahmed Ali
 Amar Singh Bulani (Sardarji/Sikh Driver) 
 Dost Muhammad
 Abdur Rahman
 Inayatullah Khan

References

External links

1948 non-fiction books
Bengali-language books
Books about Afghanistan
Travelogues
Autobiographies
Indian non-fiction books
Indian travel books
Indian autobiographies
Indian Bengali-language novels